Alpha Antliae (Alpha Ant, α Antliae, α Ant) is the brightest star in the constellation of Antlia but it has not been given a proper name. It is approximately 320 light-years from the Solar System. It is a K-type giant star with an apparent visual magnitude of 4.25. This star has 2.2 times the mass of the Sun and has expanded to 41 times the solar radius. Compared to the Sun, it has only 41% of the abundance of elements other than hydrogen and helium.

α Antliae has been reported to vary in brightness between magnitude 4.22 and 4.29, first in 1879 by Benjamin Gould, but this has not been confirmed in modern times.  The evolutionary state of α Antliae isn't clear but it is suspected of being on the asymptotic giant branch, with an inert carbon core.

References

Antliae, Alpha
Antlia
K-type giants
090610
051172
CD-30 08465
4104